was one of the chief generals of the Hosokawa clan in the Ōnin War.

Early life
Masanori was a son of Akamatsu Masamoto.

Daimyo
Masanori succeeded his father as head of the Akamatsu clan.

In 1458, Masanori was appointed governor or constable (shugo) of northern Kaga Province.

References

Daimyo
1577 deaths
Year of birth unknown